Sourav De (born 4 August 1974) is an Indian film director, producer and screenwriter. Sourav made his directorial debut with as yet unreleased Mohulti (2011), with Tanushree and Soumik as the lead. As a filmmaker, he is known for 1:30 am (2012), an award-winning Bengali film about split personality. He is setting up to come up with a dozen of short-films and aiming for a commercial release.

He is also a renowned Photographer and associate member of PGI (Photographers Guild of India). His first Photo Exhibition was held at Meridian International Center, Washington DC, United States in April 2010. California- based Global Heritage Fund organized this exhibition. It was an International photo exhibition of 77 chronicles preservation effort of endangered cultural heritage sites in developing countries.

Films 

|-
| 2022 || THE LAST RAIN || Sakshi Saha, Arunima Ghosh, Krishnendu Bandyopadhyay, Shamik Goswami
|}

References

External links
 1:30 AM
 SouravDe Films
 The Last Rain
 IMDb

1974 births
Living people
Bengali film directors